Micropora is a genus of bryozoans in the family Microporidae. Colonies are always encrusting.

Bryozoan genera
Taxa named by John Edward Gray
Cheilostomatida